Fucecchio is a town and comune   of the Metropolitan City of Florence in the Italian region of Tuscany. The main economical resources of the city are the leather industries, shoes industry and other manufacturing activities, although in the recent years their number has been decreasing because of a slight recession started.

The medieval town of Fucecchio is mentioned frequently in the opera Gianni Schicchi (1917) by Giacomo Puccini – one character, Simone, was once its podestà, and some of the estates to be distributed are situated there.

Main sights
Collegiata di San Giovanni Battista (11th century, but redone in Neo-Classicist style in the 18th century).
Abbey of San Salvatore, founded in 1001. It houses a painting by Jacopo Chimenti, derived from a similar one by Giorgio Vasari.
Oratory of Madonna della Ferruzza.
Palazzo Corsini.

People
People born in Fucecchio include:
Marco Bracci, volleyball player
Luca Cecconi, football manager and former striker
Enrico da Fucecchio, Bishop of Luni 
Manuela Falorni, best known as "la Venere bianca", pornographic actress
Alessandro Lambruschini, long-distance runner 
Giuseppe Montanelli, writer and politician
Indro Montanelli, writer and journalist
Andrea Tafi, cyclist

External links

Official website
Map of Fucecchio

Cities and towns in Tuscany